Potassium peroxymonosulfate is widely used as an oxidizing agent. It is the potassium salt of peroxymonosulfuric acid. Usually potassium peroxymonosulfate refers to the triple salt known as oxone.

The standard electrode potential for potassium peroxymonosulfate is +1.81 V with a half reaction generating the hydrogen sulfate:
HSO5− + 2 H+ + 2 e− → HSO4− + H2O

Oxone
Potassium peroxymonosulfate per se is a relatively obscure salt, but its derivative called oxone is of commercial value. Oxone refers to the triple salt 2KHSO5·KHSO4·K2SO4. Oxone has a longer shelflife than does potassium peroxymonosulfate. A white, water-soluble solid, oxone loses <1% of its oxidizing power per month.

Production
Oxone is produced from peroxysulfuric acid, which is generated in situ by combining oleum and hydrogen peroxide. Careful neutralization of this solution with potassium hydroxide allows the crystallization of the triple salt.

Uses

Cleaning
Oxone is used widely for cleaning. It whitens dentures, disinfects swimming pools, and cleans chips for the manufacture of microelectronics.

Organic chemistry 

Oxone is a versatile oxidant in organic synthesis. It oxidizes aldehydes to carboxylic acids; in the presence of alcoholic solvents, the esters may be obtained. Internal alkenes may be cleaved to two carboxylic acids (see below), while terminal alkenes may be epoxidized. Sulfides give sulfones, tertiary amines give amine oxides, and phosphines give phosphine oxides.

Further illustrative of the oxidative power of this salt is the conversion of an acridine derivative to the corresponding acridine-N-oxide.

Oxone oxidizes sulfides to sulfoxides and then to sulfones. 

Oxone converts ketones to dioxiranes. The synthesis of dimethyldioxirane (DMDO) from acetone is representative. Dioxiranes are versatile oxidising agents and may be used for the epoxidation of olefins. In particular, if the starting ketone is chiral then the epoxide may be generated enantioselectively, which forms the basis of the Shi epoxidation.

References 

Persulfates
Potassium compounds
Oxidizing agents